Spragueville may refer to:
Spragueville, Iowa
Spragueville, Pennsylvania